Norman Weissman (12 April 1925 – 27 May 2021) was an American writer, director, and producer of motion pictures and television shows. He was a graduate of Dartmouth College.

Motion picture and television career

Weissman was employed in motion pictures and television, writing, directing and producing more than four hundred TV series programs, television specials, documentaries and theatrical productions. He has had extensive experience with network and syndicated shows, including Fireside Theater, Four Star Playhouse, Armstrong Circle Theater, and the Lloyd Bridges TV series.

Early credits

Weissman's early credits include writing network radio and TV shows such as:
 The Shadow
 The Private Files of Matthew Bell with Joseph Cotten
 Cafe Istanbul with Marlene Dietrich, and Studio One

A trilogy for the USIA in 1951 was well received when shown to overseas audiences:
 Wilderness Library
 School of the Ozarks
 Ozark Newspaperwoman

He wrote the American Profiles TV series distributed by BBC and the USIA, and the CBS TV Eye on the World Pilot program with Walter Cronkite.

Theatrical credits

His theatrical credits include writing and editing Scuba with Lloyd Bridges, an Avco-Embassy-CineFilm release; writing and production managing Pepi Columbus with Joseph Meinrad, produced by Ernest Heusermann of the Stadt Theater, Vienna; and writing and directing film segments for the CBS Will Rogers, Jr. TV morning show.

TV specials

Weissman wrote and directed the following TV specials:
 Ninety Days to Nowhere
 Task Force 77
 A Man Called Skipper
 Muhammed Ali Victorious
 Men For All Seasons
 A Single Step
 Invisible World Beneath our Seas
 The Best Is Yet To Come
 Taming of A virus
 The Next Step
 The Silent Killer
 The Education of John Weems
 The Hunters

Awards

Norman Weissman has won numerous film festival awards including three American Film Festivals, a CHRIS Award and one Academy Award nomination. He was a member of the Directors Guild of America.

Books

Norman Weissman has also authored eight books.
"Snapshots USA" (2008) Hammonasset House Books, Mystic CT.
"Acceptable Losses" (2008) Hammonasset House Books, Mystic CT.
"My Exuberant Voyage" (2009) Hammonasset House Books, Mystic CT.
"Oh Palestine" (2014) Hammonasset House Books, Mystic CT
"The Prodigy" (2015) Hammonasset House Books, Mystic CT
"The Patriot" (2018) Hammonasset House Books, Mystic CT
"Prospect Park Stories" (2019) Hammonasset House Books, Mystic CT
"Requiem for Warriors" (2020) Hammonasset House Books, Mystic CT

Archives and collections
Norman Weissman's books and papers are archived at the Yale Collection of American Literature at the Beinecke Library. 
Twelve of his documentary shorts are in the collection of the Yale Film Archive.

References

External links
Norman Weissman

1925 births
2021 deaths
Dartmouth College alumni
American film producers
American television producers
American film directors
American television directors
American male writers